Mels van Driel (born Rotterdam, 2 February 1983) is a former Dutch professional footballer, now technical manager of ASWH.

Career
Van Driel played in the youth of Feyenoord and in Feyenoord's first squad in the Eredivisie (2002).

Van Driel then played for Eerste Divisie teams Excelsior (2003–2005), Fortuna Sittard (2005–2008) and RBC Roosendaal (2008–2011), for the latter 2 doubling as captain. At Fortuna Sittard he had asked a referee that an opponent from Helmond Sport would be given a yellow card, after which another Helmond Sporter "greeted" Van Driel with the Nazi salute.

From 2011 to 2020 Van Driel plays for ASWH. In August 2020, after playing in the preparations for a new season, he quit active playing and became the technical manager of ASWH.

As an international, Van Driel played in the Netherlands national under-21 football team.

References

1983 births
Living people
Dutch footballers
Feyenoord players
Excelsior Rotterdam players
RBC Roosendaal players
Fortuna Sittard players
ASWH players
Association football midfielders
Footballers from Rotterdam
Derde Divisie players
Tweede Divisie players
Netherlands youth international footballers
Netherlands under-21 international footballers